The 1973–74 season was FC Dinamo București's 25th season in Divizia A. The competition with Universitatea Craiova for the title repeated, but this time the Craiova side won the championship by one point. In this season, Dinamo brought Dudu Georgescu from CSM Reşiţa the player that will become the best scorer in history for Dinamo. In the European Cup, they surpass Northern Ireland's Crusaders Belfast (The 11–0 home game against Northern Ireland's team is still the biggest margin of victory in the history of the European Cup), but fail against Atlético Madrid (0–2 and 2–2), the team of Capon, Irueta, Heredia and Ayala.

Results

European Cup 

First round

Dinamo București won 12-0 on aggregate

Second round

Atlético Madrid won 4-2 on aggregate

Squad 

Goalkeepers: Iosif Cavai, Mircea Constantinescu.

Defenders: Florin Cheran, Augustin Deleanu, Cornel Dinu, Vasile Dobrău, Teodor Lucuță, Mircea Marian, Gabriel Sandu.

Midfielders: Gheorghe Gojgaru, Radu Nunweiller, Panfil Radu, Alexandru Sătmăreanu.

Forwards: Alexandru Custov, Florea Dumitrache, Florian Dumitrescu, Dudu Georgescu, Mircea Lucescu, Alexandru Moldovan, Viorel Sălceanu, Cristian Vrînceanu.

Transfers 

Dudu Georgescu is brought from CSM Reşiţa. Cristian Vrînceanu is promoted from the youth team.

References 
 www.labtof.ro
 www.romaniansoccer.ro

1973
Association football clubs 1973–74 season
Dinamo